The men's decathlon at the 2016 European Athletics Championships took place at the Olympic Stadium on 6 and 7 July.

Records

Schedule

Results

100 metres

Long jump

Shot put

High jump

400 metres

110 metres hurdles

Discus throw

Pole vault

Javelin throw

1500 metres

Final standings 

Decathlon M
Combined events at the European Athletics Championships